Thomas B. Tunstall (1788–1842) served as the sixth Secretary of State of Alabama from 1836 to 1840.

In addition, he served as clerk of the Alabama House of Representatives.

References

1788 births
1842 deaths
Secretaries of State of Alabama